"Doc Holliday" is a song by Danish rock band Volbeat. The song was released as the eighth and final single from the band's fifth studio album Outlaw Gentlemen & Shady Ladies. The song is about the gunfighter of the same name.

Track listing

Chart positions

References

  
Cultural depictions of Doc Holliday
2013 songs
2014 singles
Volbeat songs
Vertigo Records singles
Songs written by Michael Poulsen